Sepicana albomaculata is a species of beetle in the family Cerambycidae. It was described by Charles Joseph Gahan in 1915.

References

Tmesisternini
Beetles described in 1915